Turret Ridge is a ridge about 5 nautical miles (9 km) long extending northeast from Turret Peak, Millen Range, in Victoria Land. Visited by a New Zealand Antarctic Research Program (NZARP) geological party led by R.H. Findlay, 1981–82, and named in association with Turret Peak.

Ridges of Victoria Land
Pennell Coast